The francisca (or francesca) is a throwing axe used as a weapon during the Early Middle Ages by the Franks, among whom it was a characteristic national weapon at the time of the Merovingians from about 500 to 750 and is known to have been used during the reign of Charlemagne (768–814).
Although generally associated with the Franks, it was also used by other Germanic peoples of the period, including the Anglo-Saxons; several examples have been found in England.

Etymology

The term francisca first appeared in the book Etymologiarum sive originum, libri XVIII by Isidore of Seville (c. 560–636) as a name used in Hispania to refer to these weapons "because of their use by the Franks".

The historian Gregory of Tours (c. 538–594) in his History of the Franks uses two Latin terms for the Frankish axe: securis and bipennis.

The régime of Vichy France used the image of a stylised double-headed francisque as part of its iconography (compare fasces).

Description
The francisca is characterized by its distinctly arch-shaped head, widening toward the cutting edge and terminating in a prominent point at both the upper and lower corners. The top of the head is usually either S-shaped or convex with the lower portion curving inward and forming an elbow with the short wooden haft. Sometimes the head is more upswept, forming a wider angle with the haft. Most franciscas have a round or teardrop-shaped eye designed to fit the tapered haft, similar to Viking axes. Based on the measurements of modern replicas, the francisca had a haft length of around 40–45 cm (16–18 in) and a 10 cm (4 in) cutting edge  with an average weight of around 600 g (21 oz, 1.3 lb). Based on the surviving heads of franciscas recovered at Burgh Castle and Morning Thorpe in county Norfolk, England, the length of the head itself measured 14–15 cm (5–6 in) from the edge to the back of the socket.

Use

The Byzantine historian Procopius (c. 500–565) described the Franks and their use of throwing axes:

Procopius makes it clear that the Franks threw their axes immediately before hand-to-hand combat with the purpose of breaking shields and disrupting the enemy line while possibly wounding or killing an enemy warrior. The weight of the head and length of the haft would allow the axe to be thrown with considerable momentum to an effective range of about 12 m (40 ft). Even if the edge of the blade were not to strike the target, the weight of the iron head could cause injury. The francisca also had a psychological effect, in that, on the throwing of the francisca, the enemy might turn and run in the fear that another volley was coming.

Some sources, strangely, describe the Francisca as both the "main weapons" of the Frankish infantry around the time of Clovis. These sources also describe the Francisca as being a fierce melee weapon.

See also
Anglo-Saxon warfare
Axe
Battle axe
Hurlbat
Nzappa zap
Tomahawk

References

Further reading
Gamble, James Douglas (2002). Axes of War and Power. Tanro Company. .

External links

 An informative page about axe throwing, by Norbert C. Maier

Regia Anglorum page on Germanic battle axes

Francia
Germanic weapons
Medieval blade weapons
Throwing axes
Archaeological terminology (Germanic)